Berlevåg is the administrative centre of Berlevåg Municipality in Troms og Finnmark county, Norway. The village is located on the northeastern coast of the Varanger Peninsula along the Barents Sea. The village lies along Norwegian County Road 890, just east of Berlevåg Airport. The Hurtigruten coastal express boats stop daily at Berlevåg. About 95% of the municipal residents live in this village.

Berlevåg is one of the largest fishing villages in Finnmark county. It has several fish processing plants, a large harbor, and public services. There are four large breakwaters protecting the village from the ocean. They were built between 1913 and 1975.

Berlevåg Airport is located near the village.  The Hurtigruten boats also stop here.

History
Near the end of World War II, the Germans retreated from Finnmark county from September 1944 to February 1945 and they used scorched earth tactics and all buildings in Berlevåg were burned down.

Berlevåg became famous when the movie Heftig og begeistret about the Berlevåg Men's Choir had great success in 2001.  Berlevåg is also known for being the setting of Karen Blixen's novel Babette's Feast.

In June 2022, a production facility to generate hydrogen opened in Berlevåg. The pilot project uses  electricity from windmills to generate hydrogen through and electrolyser.

References

External links 

Villages in Finnmark
Berlevåg
Populated places of Arctic Norway